Andrew Pierce (born June 8, 1979, in Xenia, Ohio) is an American former sprinter.  He ran for Ohio State University.

References

1979 births
Living people
American male sprinters
Universiade medalists in athletics (track and field)
Sportspeople from Xenia, Ohio
Universiade gold medalists for the United States
Medalists at the 2001 Summer Universiade